The South African Railways Class 8 4-8-0 of 1902 was a steam locomotive from the pre-Union era in the Cape of Good Hope.

In 1902 and 1903, the Cape Government Railways placed 23 8th Class steam locomotives with a  Mastodon type wheel arrangement in service, three on the Cape Western System, eight on the Cape Midland System and twelve on the Cape Eastern System. In 1912, when they were assimilated into the South African Railways, they were renumbered, but retained their Class 8 classification.

Manufacture

Evolution

The first 8th Class locomotives of the Cape Government Railways (CGR) were  Consolidation types, designed by H.M. Beatty, the Chief Locomotive Superintendent of the CGR from 1896 to 1910. They entered service in 1901 and were later to become the South African Railways (SAR) Class 8X.

While these first Schenectady and ALCO-built  locomotives were being subjected to exhaustive testing on all types of traffic and under varying conditions, some trouble was experienced with the leading two-wheeled pony truck.

Manufacturer
The 23 locomotives of 1902 and 1903 were the first 8th Class locomotives of the CGR to be built with a  Mastodon type wheel arrangement. These locomotives were built by Neilson, Reid and Company in 1901 and 1902, and delivered in three batches in 1902 and 1903. In spite of the difference in wheel arrangement, these Mastodons and the earlier Consolidations of the CGR were all grouped together into the 8th Class.

They were conceived as mixed traffic locomotives, equally suitable for goods and passenger work. They had larger coupled wheels than the CGR 7th Class, bar frames, used saturated steam and had Stephenson valve gear. In service, it was found that the four-wheeled bogies and the  shorter fixed wheelbase made them steadier and easier riding than their  Consolidation predecessors.

Tenders
The first batch of three locomotives, numbered in the range from 801 to 803, went to the CGR's Western System in 1902.

Of the second batch of ten locomotives which arrived in 1902, eight were numbered in the range from 358 to 365 and allocated to the Midland System, while the other two became numbers 771 and 772, allocated to the Eastern System.

The last batch of ten locomotives, numbered in the range from 773 to 782, arrived in 1903 and all went to the Eastern System.

Class 8 sub-classes
When the Union of South Africa was established on 31 May 1910, the three Colonial government railways (CGR, Natal Government Railways and Central South African Railways) were united under a single administration to control and administer the railways, ports and harbours of the Union. Although the South African Railways and Harbours came into existence in 1910, the actual classification and renumbering of all the rolling stock of the three constituent railways were only implemented with effect from 1 January 1912.

When these 23 locomotives were assimilated into the South African Railways (SAR) in 1912, they were renumbered in the range from 1069 to 1091, but they retained their Class 8 classification.

The rest of the 8th Class Consolidations and Mastodons of the CGR, together with the Class 8-L1 to 8-L3  Mastodon locomotives of the Central South African Railways, were grouped into nine more different sub-classes by the SAR. The other  locomotives became SAR Classes 8A to 8F and the 2-8-0 locomotives became Classes 8X to 8Z.

Modification
During A.G. Watson's term as Chief Mechanical Engineer of the SAR from 1929 to 1936, many of the Class 8 to Class 8F locomotives were equipped with superheated boilers, larger bore cylinders and either inside or outside admission piston valves.

Of the Class 8 locomotives, five were equipped with superheated boilers,  bore cylinders and outside admission piston valves, while retaining their Class 8 classification.

Four locomotives were equipped with superheated boilers,  bore cylinders and inside admission piston valves and reclassified to Class 8W.

Service
In SAR service, the Class 8  family of locomotives served on every system in the country and in the 1920s became the mainstay of motive power on many branch lines. From Volksrust in the Western Transvaal system, the Class 8 worked the  link line to Bethal for several decades until the end of the 1950s, initially sharing their duties with some versions of the Class 6 family. In their last decade at Volksrust until mid-1961 they were increasingly used on standby and shunting duties while the 1948 batch of North British-built Class 19D locomotives were phased in. By 1972, they were all withdrawn from service.

Preservation
Only one member of this class survives, Class 8 no. 1090 formerly Cape Government Railways Eastern no. 781 is preserved under ownership of TRANSnet at Louis Trichaart Station.

Works numbers
The Class 8 and Class 8W works numbers, renumbering and superheating modifications are shown in the table.

Illustration
The main picture shows Class 8 no. 1088, ex CGR no. 779, at East London c. 1930, as built with slide valves, but with a rebuilt Type XF tender. The following pictures serve to illustrate the original slide valve configuration and the modified piston valve and superheating configuration.

References

1520
1520
4-8-0 locomotives
2D locomotives
Neilson Reid locomotives
Cape gauge railway locomotives 
Railway locomotives introduced in 1902
1902 in South Africa
Scrapped locomotives